In Greek mythology, Bias, was one of the three kings of Argos when the kingdom was divided into three domains. The other kings were his brother Melampus and Anaxagoras. From Bias, they say, a river in Messenia was called.

Family 
According to Pausanias, Amythaon was the father of Bias and the seer Melampus by Idomene, daughter of Pheres or Abas of Argos; otherwise their mother was called Aglaia. Bias was the father of Talaus by his first wife Pero while together with Iphianassa, daughter of Proetus, had a daughter Anaxibia (Alphesiboea) who married Pelias, to whom she bore Acastus and several daughters. It is mentioned by Apollonius of Rhodes that Bias had three sons: Talaus, Arëius, and Leodocus who were crew of the Argo. One source, named the children of Bias as Perialces, Aretos and Alphesiboea.

Mythology 
Bias married his cousin Pero who was the daughter of Neleus. It was said that Neleus would not allow his daughter to marry anyone unless the suitor brought him the oxen of Iphiclus. These Melampus achieved with courage and using his supernatural abilities of speaking with animals, upon winning the challenge he arranged the marriage of Pero and Bias. The couple had one child together, Talaus.

When Pero died, Bias remarried Iphianassa, daughter of Proetus, after Melampus had cured her, her sisters and the Argive women from madness. He received one third of Proetus's kingdom all of which he gave to Bias. According to Pausanias, the Biantidae continued to rule in Argos for four generations: Bias – Talaus – Adrastus – Diomedes – Cyanippus.

Notes

References 

 Apollodorus, The Library with an English Translation by Sir James George Frazer, F.B.A., F.R.S. in 2 Volumes, Cambridge, MA, Harvard University Press; London, William Heinemann Ltd. 1921. ISBN 0-674-99135-4. Online version at the Perseus Digital Library. Greek text available from the same website.
 Apollonius Rhodius, Argonautica translated by Robert Cooper Seaton (1853-1915), R. C. Loeb Classical Library Volume 001. London, William Heinemann Ltd, 1912. Online version at the Topos Text Project.
 Apollonius Rhodius, Argonautica. George W. Mooney. London. Longmans, Green. 1912. Greek text available at the Perseus Digital Library.
 Diodorus Siculus, The Library of History translated by Charles Henry Oldfather. Twelve volumes. Loeb Classical Library. Cambridge, Massachusetts: Harvard University Press; London: William Heinemann, Ltd. 1989. Vol. 3. Books 4.59–8. Online version at Bill Thayer's Web Site
 Diodorus Siculus, Bibliotheca Historica. Vol 1-2. Immanel Bekker. Ludwig Dindorf. Friedrich Vogel. in aedibus B. G. Teubneri. Leipzig. 1888-1890. Greek text available at the Perseus Digital Library.
 Gantz, Timothy, Early Greek Myth: A Guide to Literary and Artistic Sources, Johns Hopkins University Press, 1996, Two volumes:  (Vol. 1),  (Vol. 2).
 Herodotus, The Histories with an English translation by A. D. Godley. Cambridge. Harvard University Press. 1920. . Online version at the Topos Text Project. Greek text available at Perseus Digital Library.
 Homer, The Odyssey with an English Translation by A.T. Murray, PH.D. in two volumes. Cambridge, MA., Harvard University Press; London, William Heinemann, Ltd. 1919. . Online version at the Perseus Digital Library. Greek text available from the same website.
 Pausanias, Description of Greece with an English Translation by W.H.S. Jones, Litt.D., and H.A. Ormerod, M.A., in 4 Volumes. Cambridge, MA, Harvard University Press; London, William Heinemann Ltd. 1918. . Online version at the Perseus Digital Library
 Pausanias, Graeciae Descriptio. 3 vols. Leipzig, Teubner. 1903.  Greek text available at the Perseus Digital Library.
 Pindar, Odes translated by Diane Arnson Svarlien. 1990. Online version at the Perseus Digital Library.
 Pindar, The Odes of Pindar including the Principal Fragments with an Introduction and an English Translation by Sir John Sandys, Litt.D., FBA. Cambridge, MA., Harvard University Press; London, William Heinemann Ltd. 1937. Greek text available at the Perseus Digital Library.
 William Smith. A Dictionary of Greek and Roman Biography and Mythology. s.v. Bias. London (1848). 

Kings of Argos
Kings in Greek mythology
Messenian characters in Greek mythology
Mythology of Argos